Glenlyon is a rural locality in the Southern Downs Region, Queensland, Australia.

Geography 

Lake Glenlyon is a long thin north–south lake in the middle of the locality; it was created by impounding Pike Creek with the Glenlyon Dam. It is also known as the Pike Creek Reservoir.

Road infrastructure
The Stanthorpe – Texas Road runs through from north to west.

History 

The locality's name is derived from Glenlyon pastoral run taken up in 1844 by Alexander McLeod. The run can be seen on an 1883 Darling Downs Run Map on Pikes Creek, south of Pikes Creek run. In 1996 Scott McLeod Walker, a great grandson of Alexander McLeod, privately wrote and published a book entitled Glenlyon Connections. The book contains a history of the pastoral run and of some of the families who owned it.

References

External links 

Southern Downs Region
Localities in Queensland